Husband's Holiday is a 1931 American pre-Code drama film directed by Robert Milton and written by Ernest Pascal and Viola Brothers Shore. The film stars Clive Brook, Vivienne Osborne, Charlie Ruggles, Juliette Compton, Harry Bannister, Dorothy Tree and Adrienne Ames. The film was released on December 19, 1931, by Paramount Pictures.

Plot

Cast
Clive Brook as George Boyd
Vivienne Osborne as Mary Boyd
Charlie Ruggles as Clyde Saunders
Juliette Compton as Christine Kennedy
Harry Bannister as Andrew Trask
Dorothy Tree as Cecily Reid
Adrienne Ames as Myrtle
Charles Winninger as Mr. Reid
Elizabeth Patterson as Mrs. Caroline Reid
Leni Stengel as Molly Saunders
Dickie Moore as Philip Boyd
Marilyn Knowlden as Anne Boyd
Berton Churchill as Gerald Burgess

References

External links
 

1931 films
American drama films
1931 drama films
Paramount Pictures films
American black-and-white films
Films directed by Robert Milton
1930s English-language films
1930s American films